Corymbia cadophora, commonly known as the twinleaf bloodwood, is a species of small, straggly tree that is endemic to the Kimberley region of Western Australia. It has rough bark on the trunk and branches, a crown of sessile, egg-shaped or lance-shaped leaves joined in opposite pairs, flower buds mostly arranged in groups of seven, creamy white to pink or red flowers and urn-shaped to barrel-shaped fruit.

Description
It has thick, rough, greyish brown, tessellated bark on the trunk and branches. Flowering occurs from January to February or April, or from June or August to October and the flowers are creamy white to pinkish or red.

Taxonomy and naming
Eucalyptus cadophora was first formally described in 1995 by the botanists  Kenneth Hill and Lawrence Alexander Sidney Johnson in the journal Telopea. In the same journal, Hill and John described two subspecies and in 2007 Russell Barrett described a further subspecies. The names of the three subspecies have been accepted by the Australian Plant Census:

The specific epithet (cadophora) is derived from Greek kados meaning "a vase or wine-jar" and phoros "bearing", referring to the shape of the fruit. The epithet plianthus is from Greek pleios meaning "more" and anthos meaning "a flower" referring to the more numerous flowers, and polychroma from Greek meaning "many" and "coloured", referring to the variation in flower colour.

Distribution and habitat
Twin-leaf bloodwood is endemic to the Kimberley region of Western Australia where it is found on rocky slopes and hills and dunes and on floodplains where it grows on sandy clay loam or loamy soils over or around basalt, dolerite, sandstone and quartzite. Subspecies cadophora is widespread and locally abundant from near Derby to near Fitzroy Crossing and the Prince Regent River area, growing in low, open shrubland. Subspecies pliantha is only known from a small area south of Kununurra where it grows in low, open, grassy woodland and subspecies polychroma is only known from a small area in the Ragged Range, growing with Triodia species.

Conservation status
Subspecies cadophora and pliantha are classified as "not threatened" by the Western Australian Government Department of Parks and Wildlife but subspecies polychroma is classified as "Priority One", meaning that it is known from only one or a few locations which are potentially at risk.

See also
 List of Corymbia species

References

cadophora
Myrtales of Australia
Rosids of Western Australia
Plants described in 1995